The Savane du Nord river is a tributary of the Sainte-Anne River, flowing on the north bank of the Saint Lawrence River. This river successively crosses the unorganized territory of Lac-Pikauba and the city of Baie-Saint-Paul, in the Charlevoix, in the administrative region of Capitale-Nationale, in the province of Quebec, in Canada. The upper part begins in the southeast of the territory of the Laurentides Wildlife Reserve; then its course leaves this reserve to follow on the south side the limit of the reserve.

The upper part (area of Savane Lake) of this small valley is served by a secondary forest road. The lower part is served by a forest road that goes up the west side of the Sainte-Anne river. Forestry is the main economic activity in this valley; recreational tourism, second.

Because of the altitude, the surface of the lower part of the Savane du Nord river is generally frozen from the end of November until the beginning of April; however, safe circulation on the ice is generally done from mid-December to the end of March. The upper part has a freezing period of about an additional week. The water level of the river varies with the seasons and the precipitation; the spring flood occurs in March or April.

Geography 
The Savane du Nord river takes its source at the dam of the mouth of Savane lake, in the unorganized territory of Lac-Pikauba, in the Laurentides Wildlife Reserve. This spring between the mountains is located at:
  northeast of a mountain peak located on the west side of Savane Lake;
  northwest of a mountain peak located on the east side of Lac Savane;
  southwest of the course of the Sainte-Anne river;
  south-west of downtown Baie-Saint-Paul.

The course of the river is almost in a straight line going north, collecting a stream on the east side and another on the west side.

The Savane du Nord river flows near a bend on the south bank of the Sainte-Anne river.

From the confluence of the Savane du Nord river, the current flows over  first towards the south-east, then the south-west, following the course of the Sainte-Anne River (Beaupré), which crosses downtown Beaupré, to the northwest shore of Saint Lawrence River.

Toponymy 
This toponym appears on the draft of the Maillard map, 1959-05-21, item 121. The water table is found on the Seminary Lands of Quebec. Rivière Savane is a variant of the official name.

The toponym "rivière Savane du Nord" was formalized on December 5, 1968 at the Place Names Bank of the Commission de toponymie du Québec.

References

See also 

 Laurentides Wildlife Reserve
 Capitale-Nationale, an administrative region
 Charlevoix Regional County Municipality
 Lac-Pikauba, an unorganized territory
 Baie-Saint-Paul, a municipality
 Sainte-Anne River (Beaupré)
 Savane Lake (Lac-Pikauba)
 St. Lawrence River
 List of rivers of Quebec

Rivers of Capitale-Nationale
Charlevoix Regional County Municipality
Laurentides Wildlife Reserve